Maciej Dunal (20 December 1953 – 8 January 2014) was a Polish actor and singer.

Maciej Dunal died on 8 January 2014, aged 60, in Gdynia. His funeral was held on 13 January.

References

External links

1953 births
2014 deaths
Polish male film actors
Polish male television actors
Polish male stage actors
Polish male singers